Meyer "Mike" Bloom (January 14, 1915 – June 5, 1993) was an American professional basketball player.

He attended Trenton Central High School, earning state basketball championships in 1932, 1933 and 1934.

Born in New York City, he played collegiately for the Temple University.

He played for the Baltimore Bullets and Boston Celtics (1947–48), Minneapolis Lakers and Chicago Stags (1948–49) in the BAA for 93 games.

BAA career statistics

Regular season

Playoffs

See also
List of select Jewish basketball players

References

External links

1915 births
1993 deaths
All-American college men's basketball players
American men's basketball players
Baltimore Bullets (1944–1954) players
Boston Celtics players
Chicago Stags players
Jewish American sportspeople
Jewish men's basketball players
Minneapolis Lakers players
Basketball players from Trenton, New Jersey
Basketball players from New York City
Trenton Central High School alumni
Temple Owls men's basketball players
Centers (basketball)
Forwards (basketball)
20th-century American Jews